Cristian Gabriel Poglajen (born 14 July 1989 in Morón) is an Argentinian volleyball player. He was part of the Argentina men's national volleyball team. He competed with the national team at the 2012 Summer Olympics in London, Great Britain and the 2016 Olympics in Rio. He played with Sarmiento Voley in 2012.

Clubs
  Sarmiento Voley (2012)

See also
 Argentina at the 2012 Summer Olympics

References

1989 births
Living people
Argentine men's volleyball players
Argentine people of Slovenian descent
Volleyball players at the 2012 Summer Olympics
Olympic volleyball players of Argentina
Volleyball players at the 2016 Summer Olympics
Medalists at the 2020 Summer Olympics
Olympic bronze medalists for Argentina
Olympic medalists in volleyball
People from Morón Partido
Volleyball players at the 2020 Summer Olympics
Sportspeople from Buenos Aires Province